is a Japanese visual novel adventure game for the PlayStation Portable and by Intense and D3 Publisher. It was released on February 4, 2010. An enhanced version of game for the Nintendo Switch and Microsoft Windows was released worldwide on December 17, 2020.

Gameplay
Abyss of the Sacrifice has two modes of gameplay. The first mode requires little interaction on the player's part as much of the player's time will be spent on reading the text that appears on the game's screen. These lines of text represents either the inner thoughts of the characters or the conversation the characters are having with one another. After a stage has been completed, the player will be presented with a screen displaying the possible stages that the player can advance to. Stages that have been completed will be highlighted in blue whereas those that have not been played will be in orange. Each row of stages has a character's name attached to it which will determine which character will be the main character. As stages are completed, more stages will become available. The ending of the game will differ based on the stages that have been selected.

The second mode is more closely connected to adventure games. The player is tasked with the need to investigate different scenes to find clues and items. It is even possible to combine items together to create new items. The player will then try to solve the puzzles in the game using the information and items they have acquired.

Plot

Setting
The story of Abyss of the Sacrifice takes place in an underground facility called . It is not clear why the facility was built and there is no longer anyone above the ground that knows of its existence.

Characters
There are five main characters in Abyss of the Sacrifice.  is a Japanese girl who is good at sports and was originally aiming to become a high jumper but due to an injury she received during a practice, she has given this up.  is a Russian girl who appears before Miki covered in blood.  is the daughter of a famous doctor and an honours student. She is familiar with some basics regarding medical treatment.  is a very intelligent German girl and is skilled at cracking into computer systems.  is a Slav who is able to see other people's pasts in her dreams.

Release

A demo containing two stages from the game was released on January 12, 2010.
An enhanced version of game for the Nintendo Switch and Microsoft Windows was released worldwide on December 17, 2020.

Reception

References

External links
Official website 
Official website 
 

2010 video games
Adventure games
D3 Publisher games
Japan-exclusive video games
PlayStation Portable games
Nintendo Switch games
Windows games
Science fiction video games
Video games developed in Japan
Video games featuring female protagonists
Visual novels
Bishōjo games